Lonny Price (born March 9, 1959) is an American director, actor, and writer, primarily in theatre. He is perhaps best known for his creation of the role of Charley Kringas in the Broadway musical Merrily We Roll Along and for his New York directing work including Sunset Boulevard, Sweeney Todd, Company, and Sondheim! The Birthday Concert.

Biography

Early life and career
Price was born in New York City, the son of Edie L. (Greene), a merchandise manager, and Murray A. Price, a car leasing company owner. Price grew up in Fresh Meadows, New York and Metuchen, New Jersey. He attended the Fiorello H. LaGuardia High School of Performing Arts, and the Juilliard School.

His early career was spent performing in Off-Broadway productions, including Class Enemy in 1979, for which he won a Theater World Award for a stage debut. His first major Broadway credit was the ill-fated Stephen Sondheim/Hal Prince/George Furth musical Merrily We Roll Along (1981), which underwent constant changes during an unusually long preview period and closed after only sixteen performances. His next show, the Athol Fugard play "Master Harold"...and the Boys, in which he portrayed a South African student opposite Danny Glover and Zakes Mokae as the family servants - ran for eight months.

In 1989, he appeared as Jimmy Durante in the musical bio Durante.

Direction
Price made his directorial debut with the Off-Broadway revival of The Education of H*Y*M*A*N K*A*P*L*A*N in 1989 for the American Jewish Theater, followed by The Rothschilds and Juno, both of which received Outer Critics Circle nominations for Best Revival.

He has directed numerous musical productions, both concert and non-concert, with the New York Philharmonic, which include Stephen Sondheim's Sweeney Todd with Patti LuPone and George Hearn in 2000, for which he won an Emmy Award, Leonard Bernstein's Candide (2004), with Kristin Chenoweth, Sir Thomas Allen, and Patti LuPone, Passion with Patti LuPone and Audra McDonald, for which he also won an Emmy Award, and Camelot with Gabriel Byrne, Marin Mazzie, Christopher Lloyd, and Nathan Gunn, among other productions.

In March 2010, he conceived and directed Sondheim! The Birthday Concert at the New York Philharmonic, celebrating the composer-lyricist's 80th Birthday. The PBS television broadcast was nominated for several Emmy Awards, and Price won for "Outstanding Directing For A Variety, Music Or Comedy Special."

In April 2011 he directed an acclaimed concert production of Sondheim's Company with Neil Patrick Harris, Stephen Colbert, Martha Plimpton, Christina Hendricks, and Patti LuPone, backed by the New York Philharmonic.

In 2013, he again directed Sweeney Todd at the New York Philharmonic, this time starring Emma Thompson and Bryn Terfel. The PBS telecast for Live from Lincoln Center won the Emmy Award for "Outstanding Variety, Music, Or Comedy Special."

He has directed numerous productions at the Chicago Ravinia Festival, including Sweeney Todd, Gypsy, Sunday in the Park With George, Anyone Can Whistle, Passion, and Annie Get Your Gun. Frequent collaborators for his productions include performers Patti LuPone, Audra McDonald, Michael Cerveris, and George Hearn, and musical director and conductor Paul Gemignani.

In 2000, Price co-wrote (with Linda Kline), directed, and starred in A Class Act, based on the life and career of composer-lyricist Edward Kleban, whose sole Broadway credit was A Chorus Line. The score consisted of songs Kleban had written for other shows that remained unproduced. After a two-month run at the Manhattan Theatre Club, it transferred to the Ambassador Theatre, where it fared less successfully and closed after three months. It earned Price his sole Tony Award nomination to date, for Best Book of a Musical. The show was also nominated for four other Tony Awards, including Best Musical. He directed a Broadway revival of 110 in the Shade at the Roundabout Theatre Company in 2007, starring Audra McDonald. The play was nominated for the 2007 Tony Award, Best Revival of a Musical (among others). He directed the 2014 Broadway production of Lady Day at Emerson's Bar and Grill starring McDonald, who won her historic sixth Tony Award for her performance as Billie Holiday. He would subsequently stage the production in 2017 on the West End in London, again starring McDonald, as well as the HBO special. In 2016, he directed the acclaimed London revival of Sunset Boulevard starring Glenn Close, which transferred to Broadway and played a limited run in 2017.

Price served as Associate Artistic Director for the American Jewish Theatre from the late 1980s through the mid-1990s. He was artistic director at Musical Theatre Works, a non-profit theatre dedicated solely to the development of new musicals until 2002, when he became resident director.

In 2016, Price directed the documentary Best Worst Thing That Ever Could Have Happened, which chronicles the ill-fated journey of Stephen Sondheim and Harold Prince's original 1981 Broadway musical Merrily We Roll Along. It played the New York Film Festival, and was named one of the New York Times Top Ten Films of 2016.

His episodic television directing work includes five episodes of Desperate Housewives and three episodes of 2 Broke Girls.

Price will direct the Roundabout Theatre Company premiere of the musical Scotland, PA.

Price is a guest instructor at HB HB Studio.

Acting credits
Possibly his most significant Off-Broadway stage credit as an actor is the William Finn – James Lapine musical Falsettoland as Mendel in 1990.

Price's film and television credits include small roles in The Muppets Take Manhattan and Dirty Dancing, and guest appearances on The Golden Girls and Law & Order. Behind the scenes, he was a staff director for the ABC soap opera One Life to Live, for which he was part of a team that received a Daytime Emmy Award nomination for Outstanding Drama Series Directing in 1995.

Select credits
Source: BroadwayWorld

 2017: Lady Day at Emerson's Bar and Grill (West End, director)
 2017: Sunset Boulevard (director)
 2016: Best Worst Thing That Ever Could Have Happened (film, director)
 2016: Sunset Boulevard (West End, director)
 2014: Lady Day at Emerson's Bar and Grill (director)
 2013: Sweeney Todd (director)
 2011: Company (director)
 2010: Sondheim! The Birthday Concert (director)
 2008: Camelot (director)
 2007: 110 in the Shade (director)
 2005: Children and Art (performer) (Sondheim benefit concert)
 2003: "Master Harold"...and the Boys (director)
 2003: Urban Cowboy (director)
 2001: A Class Act (director, writer, star)
 1994: Sally Marr...and Her Escorts (co-writer with Joan Rivers and Erin Ladd Sanders; director)
 1992: Flodders in America (actor)
 1988:  The Golden Girls (actor):  Played “Hastings”, season 3, episode “Mr Terrific”.  
 1987: Burn This (actor)
 1987: Broadway (actor)
 1987: Dirty Dancing (film, actor)
 1986: Rags (actor)
 1981: "Master Harold"...and the Boys (actor)
 1981: Merrily We Roll Along (actor)
 1981: The Survivor (actor)

References

External links
 
 
 

American male musical theatre actors
American male film actors
American male television actors
American theatre directors
American musical theatre librettists
20th-century American dramatists and playwrights
People from Metuchen, New Jersey
Singers from New York City
1959 births
Living people
Fiorello H. LaGuardia High School alumni
Primetime Emmy Award winners